Ha Kwang-chul (born 27 March 1990) is a South Korean sport shooter.

He participated at the 2018 ISSF World Shooting Championships, winning a medal.

References

External links

Living people
1990 births
South Korean male sport shooters
Running target shooters